Tuyserkan (also Romanized as Tūyserkān, Tooyserkan, Tūīsarkān, and Tūysarkān) is a city and capital of Tuyserkan County, Hamadan Province, Iran. At the 2016 census, its population was 50,455, in 16,291 families.

Tuyserkan is located about 100 km south of Hamadan, in western Iran.

References

Cities in Hamadan Province
Populated places in Tuyserkan County